Saul Monastery is a former Christian monastery located in County Down, Northern Ireland. It is traditionally associated with the 5th-century Saint Patrick, who is said to have founded it shortly after arriving in Ireland, and having died there at the end of his missionary work.

Location

Saul Monastery is located 2.7 km (1.5 mile) northeast of Downpatrick; the River Quoile is 1.5 km (1 mile) to the northwest.

History

According to tradition, the monastery was founded by Saint Patrick shortly after his arrival in AD 432; he landed via the nearby River Slaney and was granted a barn (Old Irish saball) by the local chieftain Dichu. He then placed it under the protection of Dunnius (Mo Duin).

It is the traditional site of death of Saint Patrick, who died at Saul on 17 March 465.

Saul Monastery survived for over three centuries before being destroyed by Viking raids.

The Annals of the Four Masters mention a "Ceannfaeladh of Sabhall, bishop, anchorite, and pilgrim" in 1011. A stone church was burned at Saul in 1020.

Some time after 1130 Saul was refounded as an Augustinian priory of Canons Regular by Saint Malachy; legend claims that he had a vision of the monastery before he constructed it. In 1164 Saul was plundered by Muirchertach Mac Lochlainn with the men of Fearnmhagh, the Cenél Conaill, and the Cenél nEógain. In 1170 a lengthy description of the expulsion of monks from Saul is given:

In 1289 or 1293, Nicholas Mac Mail-Issu discovered the remains of Saints Patrick, Colum Cille and Brigid of Kildare at Saul; he placed them in a shrine. By 1296 Saul is described as greatly impoverished.

It was destroyed by Edward Bruce's armies during the Bruce invasion of Ireland in 1318. In 1380 a statute forbade any Gaelic Irish from becoming religious at Saul; only British settlers could. The seal of the Abbot of Saul was on a petition to King Henry IV c. 1410. At the dissolution of the monasteries, the abbey, with two castles, a garden and land were granted to Gerald FitzGerald, 11th Earl of Kildare in 1542.

A pattern took place at Saul on the second Sunday of June, "Saul Sunday."

Buildings

One wall of the Augustinian abbey remains, and a stone monastic cell (also called the "mortuary house") in the old graveyard. There is also a cross slab in the graveyard. Other gravestones have been moved to the Down County Museum.

The present Church of Ireland building was opened on All Saint's Day 1933; it replaced a simple 1788 structure.

References

External links

Christian monasteries established in the 5th century
Augustinian monasteries in Northern Ireland
Religious buildings and structures in County Down
Archaeological sites in County Down
Saint Patrick